The HafenCity University Hamburg (abbreviated HCU) — also known as the University Of The Built Environment And Metropolitan Development — is a public university in Hamburg, Germany which is focused on architecture, civil engineering and urban planning courses.

The university's name refers to its location in Hamburg's HafenCity, the site of an urban regeneration project where the old port warehouses of Hamburg are being replaced with offices, hotels, shops, official buildings, and residential areas.

Courses 

HCU offers the following courses as Bachelor's and Master's degrees:

 Architecture
 Civil Engineering
 Geodesy and Geoinformatics
 Urban Planning
 Urban Design and Resource Efficiency in Architecture and Planning (REAP) are also available as interdisciplinary master's degrees.

See also
Living lab (MIT City Science lab)

References

External links 
 Main website

2006 establishments in Germany
Educational institutions established in 2006
Universities in Germany
Education in Hamburg
Universities and colleges in Hamburg